Carrie is a 1976 American supernatural horror film directed by Brian De Palma from a screenplay written by Lawrence D. Cohen, adapted from Stephen King's 1974 epistolary novel of the same name. The film stars Sissy Spacek as Carrie White, a shy 16-year-old who is consistently mocked and bullied at school. The film also features Piper Laurie, Amy Irving, Nancy Allen, William Katt, P. J. Soles, Betty Buckley, and John Travolta in supporting roles. It is the first film in the Carrie franchise.

The film was based on King's first published novel. De Palma was intrigued by the story and pushed for the studio to direct it while Spacek was encouraged by her husband to audition. It is the first of more than 100 film and television productions adapted from, or based on, the published works of King.

Theatrically released on November 3, 1976, by United Artists, Carrie became critically and commercially successful, grossing over $33.8 million against its $1.8 million budget. It received two nominations at the 49th Academy Awards: Best Actress (for Spacek) and Best Supporting Actress (for Laurie). Critics and audience members alike widely cite it as the best adaptation of the novel amongst the numerous films and television shows based on the character, as well as one of the best films based on King's publications.

The film has significantly influenced popular culture, with several publications regarding it as one of the greatest horror films ever made. In 2008, Carrie was ranked 86th on Empire's list of The 500 Greatest Movies of All Time. It was ranked 15th on Entertainment Weekly'''s list of the 50 Best High School Movies, and 46th on the American Film Institute list AFI's 100 Years...100 Thrills. The film's prom scene has had a major influence on popular culture and was ranked eighth on Bravos 2004 program The 100 Scariest Movie Moments. In 2022, the film was selected for preservation in the United States National Film Registry by the Library of Congress as being "culturally, historically, or aesthetically significant".

Plot
Shy 16-year-old Carrie White, who lives with her fanatically religious and unstable mother Margaret, is unpopular at school and often bullied by her peers. When Carrie experiences her first period in the school shower, she panics, having never been told about menstruation. Carrie's classmates throw tampons and sanitary pads at her while chanting "Plug it up!" until the gym teacher, Miss Collins, intervenes. Following conversations with Miss Collins and the principal, Carrie is dismissed from school for the day. After arriving home, Margaret tells Carrie that her menstruation was caused by sin, and she locks Carrie in an altar-like "prayer closet" to pray for forgiveness. At school, Collins reprimands Carrie's tormentors, punishing them with a week-long detention during gym class. She threatens that those who skip the punitive measure will be suspended for three days and barred from the upcoming prom. However, Carrie's longtime bully, Christine "Chris" Hargensen, walks out and gets excluded from the prom.

Plotting vengeance against Carrie, Chris and her boyfriend Billy Nolan break into a farm and kill pigs to drain their blood into a bucket, which they place above the school's stage in the gymnasium. Norma, Chris' best friend and a prominent figure in the school's student council regime, plans to rig the Prom Queen election in Carrie's favor to get her on the stage. Meanwhile, Sue Snell, a deeply remorseful classmate, asks her handsome and popular boyfriend, Tommy Ross, to invite Carrie to the prom. Carrie believes the proposition is a prank, but he insists that it is genuine and she reluctantly accepts after Miss Collins consoles her. At home, she begins to discover that she has telekinesis as she shakes off her shyness. Despite Margaret's protests, Carrie puts on a flattering dress and hairstyle for the prom. Margaret sees Carrie's telekinetic powers and denounces her as a witch before Carrie leaves with Tommy.

During the prom, Chris and Billy hide under the stage while the other conspirators switch the ballots to ensure that Carrie wins the Prom Queen title. As Carrie stands onstage with Tommy, finally beginning to feel accepted by her peers, Sue realizes Chris and Billy's plan, and begins to intervene. Miss Collins spots Sue and, thinking that she is up to no good, throws her out of the prom. Chris and Billy pull the rope attached to the bucket of pig blood, dousing Carrie; they then sneak out of the school. The empty bucket hits the outraged Tommy in the head, and he collapses. The crowd is left shocked and speechless at the prank, but Carrie hallucinates that everyone, even Miss Collins, is mocking her and, in a sudden outburst, telekinetically seals the exits and controls a fire hose, which injures several party-goers attempting to escape and sprays the overhead lights. Miss Collins is crushed by a falling basketball backboard and Carrie's principal and teacher are electrocuted, setting the gym on fire. Carrie exits the gym and seals the doors behind her, trapping staff and classmates. As Carrie walks home, Chris and Billy attempt to run her over with Billy's car but Carrie causes their car to overturn and explode, killing them.

After Carrie bathes herself at home, Margaret reveals that Carrie was conceived when her husband was drunk, an act that Margaret shamefully admits she enjoyed. She comforts Carrie, and then stabs her in the back with a kitchen knife and begins chasing her through the house. Carrie levitates several sharp implements and sends them flying toward Margaret, crucifying her; then, she destroys the house and perishes.

Some time later, Sue, the only survivor of the prom, has a nightmare in which she goes to lay flowers on the charred remains of Carrie's home, upon which stands a "For Sale" sign vandalized in black paint with the words: "Carrie White burns in Hell!". Suddenly, Carrie's bloody arm reaches from beneath the rubble and grabs Sue's forearm. Sue wakes up screaming and writhing in terror as her mother tries to comfort her.

Cast

Production
DevelopmentCarrie was the first Stephen King novel to be published and the first to be adapted into a feature film. During an interview in 2010, King said he was 26 years old at the time and was paid just $2,500 for the film rights, but added that he was fortunate to happen to his first book. De Palma told Cinefantastique in an interview in 1977:

Lawrence D. Cohen was hired as the screenwriter, and produced the first draft, which had closely followed the novel's intentions. United Artists accepted the second draft but only allocated De Palma a budget of $1.6 million, a small amount considering the popularity of horror films at the time. The budget eventually rose to $1.8 million. Certain scripted scenes were omitted from the final version, mainly due to financial limitations.

Casting
Many young actresses auditioned for the lead role, including Melanie Griffith. Sissy Spacek was persuaded by husband Jack Fisk to audition for the title role. Fisk then convinced De Palma to let her audition, and she read for all of the parts. De Palma's first choice for the role of Carrie was Betsy Slade, who received good notices for her role in the film Our Time (1974). Determined to land the leading role, Spacek backed out of a television commercial she was scheduled to film, rubbed Vaseline into her hair, left her face unwashed, and arrived for her screen test clad in a sailor dress which her mother had made her in the seventh grade, with the hem cut off, and was given the part.

Nancy Allen was the last to audition, and her audition came just as she was on the verge of leaving Hollywood. She and De Palma later married in 1979, but they divorced in 1984.

Filming
De Palma began with director of photography Isidore Mankofsky, who was eventually replaced by Mario Tosi after conflict between Mankofsky and De Palma ensued. Gregory M. Auer, assisted by Ken Pepiot, served as the special effects supervisor for Carrie, with Jack Fisk, Spacek's husband, as art director.

The White house was filmed in Santa Paula, California. To give the house a Gothic theme, the director and producers visited religious souvenir shops to find artifacts to decorate the set location.

A wraparound segment at the beginning and end of the film was scripted and filmed, which featured the Whites' home being pummeled by stones that hailed from the sky. The opening scene was filmed as planned, though on celluloid, the tiny pebbles looked like rain water. A mechanical malfunction botched filming the night when the model of the Whites' home was set to be destroyed by stones, so the filmmakers burned it down instead and deleted the scenes with the stones altogether. The original opening scene is presumed lost.

The final scene, in which Sue reaches toward Carrie's grave, was shot backwards to give it a dreamlike quality. This scene was inspired by the final scene in Deliverance (1972). Rather than let a stunt double perform the scene underground, Spacek insisted on using her own hand in the scene, so she was positioned under the rocks and gravel. De Palma explains that crew members "had to bury her. Bury her! We had to put her in a box and stick her underneath the ground. Well, I had her husband [Fisk] bury her because I certainly didn't want to bury her".

Music
The score for Carrie was composed by Pino Donaggio. In addition, Donaggio scored two pop songs ("Born to Have It All" and "I Never Dreamed Someone Like You Could Love Someone Like Me") with lyrics by Merrit Malloy for the early portion of the prom sequence. These songs were performed by Katie Irving (sister of Amy Irving and daughter of Priscilla Pointer). Donaggio would work again with De Palma on Home Movies, Dressed to Kill, Blow Out, Body Double, Raising Cain, Passion, and Domino.

The soundtrack album was originally released on vinyl in 1976 from United Artists Records. A deluxe CD edition containing a few tracks of dialogue from the film was released by Rykodisc in 1997, and a 2005 CD re-release of the original soundtrack (minus dialogue) was available from Varèse Sarabande. In 2010, Kritzerland Records released all 35 cues of Donaggio's score for the film on a two-disc CD set which was presented as the complete score. Also included in this edition were the versions of "Born to Have It All" and "I Never Dreamed..." which were heard in the film, as well as instrumentals of both songs, and hidden at the end of the final track, a version of the "Calisthenics" cue with Betty Buckley's studio-recorded voice-over from the detention scene. The second disc was a remastered copy of the original 13-track album. The Kritzerland release was a limited edition of 1,200 copies. Kritzerland rereleased the first disc as "The Encore Edition" in February 2013; this release was limited to 1,000 copies.

Release
The film opened November 3, 1976 in 17 theaters in the Washington D.C.-Baltimore area. Two days later, it opened in 9 theaters in Chicago, then opened in 53 theaters in New York City on November 16 and in Los Angeles on November 17.

Reception and legacyCarrie received widespread critical acclaim and was cited as one of the best films of the year. Rotten Tomatoes gives the film an approval rating of 93% based on 67 reviews, with an average rating of 8.3/10. The website's critical consensus reads, "Carrie is a horrifying look at supernatural powers, high school cruelty, and teen angst—and it brings us one of the most memorable and disturbing prom scenes in history". On Metacritic, which assigns a normalized rating based on reviews, the film has a weighted average score of 85 out of 100, based on 14 critic reviews, indicating "universal acclaim".

Roger Ebert of the Chicago Sun-Times stated that the film was an "absolutely spellbinding horror movie", as well as an "observant human portrait", giving three and a half stars out of four. Pauline Kael of The New Yorker wrote that Carrie was "the best scary-funny movie since Jaws—a teasing, terrifying, lyrical shocker". Take One Magazine critic Susan Schenker said she was "angry at the way Carrie manipulated me to the point where my heart was thudding, and embarrassed because the film really works". A 1998 edition of The Movie Guide stated that Carrie was a "landmark horror film", while Stephen Farber prophetically wrote in a 1978 issue of New West Magazine, "it's a horror classic, and years from now it will still be written and argued about, and it will still be scaring the daylights out of new generations of moviegoers". Quentin Tarantino placed Carrie at number eight in a list of his favorite films.

In a 2010 interview, King replied that he thought, although dated now, Carrie was a "good movie".

Nevertheless, the film was not without its detractors. Andrew Sarris of The Village Voice wrote: "There are so few incidents that two extended sequences are rendered in slow-motion as if to pad out the running time..." Gene Siskel of the Chicago Tribune gave the film two-and-a-half stars out of four and called it "a crude shocker with a little style", praising the "strong performances" but opining that the movie "falls apart" during the climax which he described as "crude and sloppy".

Box officeCarrie was a box office success earning $14.5 million in theatrical rentals in the United States and Canada by January 1978Richard Nowell, Blood Money: A History of the First Teen Slasher Film Cycle Continuum, 2011 p 256 from a gross of $33.8 million. In its first 19 days from 60 markets, the film had grossed $3,882,827. Overseas, the film earned rentals of $7 million for a worldwide total of $22 million.

AccoladesCarrie is one of the few horror films to be nominated for multiple Academy Awards. Spacek and Laurie received nominations for Best Actress and Best Supporting Actress awards, respectively. The film also won the grand prize at the Avoriaz Fantastic Film Festival, and Spacek was given the Best Actress award by the National Society of Film Critics. In 2008, Carrie was ranked number 86 on Empire's list of The 500 Greatest Movies of All Time. The movie also ranked number 15 on the Entertainment Weekly list of the 50 Best High School Movies, and No. 46 on the American Film Institute's list of 100 Greatest Cinema Thrills, and was ranked eighth for its ending sequence on Bravo's The 100 Scariest Movie Moments (2004).

 AFI's 100 Years...100 Thrills – #46
 AFI's 100 Years...100 Heroes and Villains – Carrie White – Nominated Villain

Related productionsCarrie, along with the novel, has been reproduced and adapted several times.

SequelThe Rage: Carrie 2 was released in 1999. It featured another teenager with telekinetic powers who is revealed to have shared a father with Carrie White. The film received universally negative reviews and was a box-office failure. Amy Irving reprises her role of Sue Snell from the previous film.

2002 television film

In 2002, a television film based on King's novel and starring Angela Bettis in the titular role was released. The film updated the events of the story to modern-day settings and technology while simultaneously attempting to be more faithful to the book's original structure, story, and specific events. However, the ending was drastically changed: Instead of killing her mother and then herself, the film has Carrie killing her mother, being revived via CPR by Sue Snell and being driven to Florida to hide. This new ending marked a complete divergence from the novel and was a signal that the film served as a pilot for a Carrie television series, which never materialized. In the new ending, the rescued Carrie vows to help others with similar gifts to her own. Although Bettis' portrayal of Carrie was highly praised, the film was cited by most critics as inferior to the original.

2013 remake

In 2011, Metro-Goldwyn-Mayer and Screen Gems acquired the novel rights to adapt Carrie to film once more. Playwright Roberto Aguirre-Sacasa wrote the script as "a more faithful adaptation" of King's novel but shared a screenplay credit with the 1976 film's writer Lawrence D. Cohen. Aguirre-Sacasa had previously adapted King's epic novel The Stand into comic-book form in 2008.

The role of Carrie was played by 16-year-old actress Chloë Grace Moretz. Julianne Moore starred as Carrie's mother Margaret White, and Gabriella Wilde as Sue Snell. Alex Russell and Ansel Elgort played Billy Nolan and Tommy Ross respectively. Portia Doubleday was given the role of Chris Hargensen, and Judy Greer was cast as Miss Desjardin.

Kimberly Peirce, known for her work on Boys Don't Cry, directed the new adaptation. It was released on October 18, 2013, and received mixed reviews.

Stage productions

A 1988 Broadway musical of the same name, based on King's novel and starring Betty Buckley, Linzi Hateley, and Darlene Love, closed after only 16 previews and 5 performances. An English pop opera filtered through Greek tragedy, the show was so notorious that it provided the title to Ken Mandelbaum's survey of theatrical disasters Not Since Carrie: Forty Years of Broadway Musical Flops.

Early in the 21st century, playwright Erik Jackson attempted to secure the rights to stage another production of Carrie the musical, but his request was rejected. Jackson eventually earned the consent of King to mount a new, officially sanctioned, non-musical production of Carrie, which debuted Off-Broadway in 2006 with drag queen Sherry Vine in the lead role. Similarly, many other unofficial spoofs have been staged over the years, usually with a gym teacher named "Miss Collins" (as opposed to the novel's "Miss Desjardin" and the musical's "Miss Gardner"), most notably the "parodage" Scarrie the Musical, which hit the Illinois stage in 1998 and was revived in 2005; Dad's Garage Theatre's 2002 production of Carrie White the Musical; and the 2007 New Orleans production of Carrie's Facts of Life, which was a hybrid of Carrie and the sitcom The Facts of Life. A high school production of the musical is the focus of "Chapter Thirty-One: A Night to Remember" episode of Riverdale.

Home mediaCarrie was originally released on VHS and LaserDisc formats, for which it received numerous editions throughout the world.

In the United States and Canada, Carrie has been made available several times on DVD format from MGM Home Entertainment, debuting on September 29, 1998, while a "Special Edition" set was released on August 28, 2001. On December 4, 2007, the film was released a part of MGM's "Decades Collection", which included a soundtrack CD. The film was additionally released within multiple sets via MGM; first, as part of the United Artists 90th Anniversary Prestige Collection on December 11, 2007. A set featuring Carrie, The Rage: Carrie 2, and Carrie (the 2002 television film) was released on September 14, 2010, and, as part of MGM's 90th anniversary, the film was included with Misery and The Silence of the Lambs on June 3, 2014.

The film was released for the first time on Blu-ray in the U.S. and Canada from MGM on October 7, 2008, which contained an MPEG-2 codec, with new DTS-HD 5.1 Master Lossless Audio, while retaining the original English Mono, and included Spanish Audio and French 5.1 Dolby Surround. The only special feature on the set is a theatrical trailer. The film was again released on Blu-ray on July 18, 2013, when it was available exclusively through Comic-Con in San Diego from MGM and FoxConnect, containing a slipcover with exclusive artwork. Two further editions were made available from MGM in 2014; a "Carrie 2-Pack" set containing the original film and the 2013 adaptation, released September 9, and finally, a re-issue Blu-ray with a collectible Halloween faceplate, on October 21. Home distribution rights are currently held by Shout Factory, and the film was released via their subsidiary label, Scream Factory on October 11, 2016, in a two-disc "Collector's Edition", now available with MPEG-4 coding, and a new 4K scan. Special features on the set include the theatrical trailer, Carrie franchise trailer gallery, new interviews with writer Lawrence D. Cohen, editor Paul Hirsch, actors Piper Laurie, P.J. Soles, Nancy Allen, Betty Buckley, William Katt, and Edie McClurg, casting director Harriet B. Helberg, director of photography Mario Tosi, and composer Pino Donaggio, "Horror's Hallowed Grounds" – Revisiting the Film's Original Locations, "Acting Carrie" featurette, "Visualizing Carrie" featurette, a look at "Carrie the Musical", TV spots, radio spots, still gallery, "Stephen King and the Evolution of Carrie" text gallery. The set also includes reversible sleeve containing original artwork and newly commissioned artwork from Shout Factory, and a slipcover containing the new artwork. Shout Factory additionally released a "Deluxe Limited Edition" of 2000 copies, which includes the slipcover contained in the "Collector's Edition", with an additional poster matching the slipcover, and an alternative slipcover and poster consisting of different artwork.

In the United Kingdom, the film received its initial DVD release on February 1, 2000, via MGM. A reissue "Special Edition" DVD was made available from MGM on October 22, 2001, while a two-disc standard set was released on September 7, 2006. A DVD set, "The Carrie Collection", consisting of both the original film, and The Rage: Carrie 2, was released from 20th Century Fox Home Entertainment on October 7, 2013, while on the same day, a reissue DVD containing newly commissioned artwork, as well as the first-ever Blu-ray release in the UK was made available from 20th Century Fox. A second Blu-ray edition became available in the form of a steelbook, released on September 29, 2014, a set which reverted to the previous-style artwork.Carrie would later receive a "Limited Collector's Edition" Blu-ray of 5,000 copies from Arrow Films, providing the definitive release of the film. The set contained a new 4K restoration, with special features, including commentary by authors Lee Gambin and Alexandra Heller-Nicholas, recorded exclusively for the release; brand-new visual essay comparing the various versions and adaptations of Carrie; "Acting Carrie" featurette, "More Acting Carrie" featurette; "Writing Carrie", an interview with writer Lawrence D. Cohen/"Shooting Carrie", an interview with cinematographer Mario Tosi; "Cutting Carrie", an interview with editor Paul Hirsch/"Casting Carrie", an interview with casting director Harriet B. Helberg; "Bucket of Blood", an interview with composer Pino Donaggio; "Horror's Hallowed Grounds", a look back at the film's locations, gallery, trailer, TV spots, radio spots; Carrie trailer reel; and 60-page limited-edition booklet featuring new writing on the film by author Neil Mitchell, alongside reversible artwork, poster and art cards. The set was released on December 11, 2017.Squires, John

References

 Further reading
 Ehlers, Leigh A. "Carrie: Book and film". Literature/Film Quarterly 9.1 (1981): 32–39.
 Shih, Paris Shun-Hsiang. "Fearing the Witch, Hating the Bitch: The Double Structure of Misogyny in Stephen King's Carrie" in Perceiving Evil: Evil Women and the Feminine (Brill, 2015) pp. 49–58.
 Tibbetts, John C., and James M. Welsh, eds. The Encyclopedia of Novels into Film (2nd ed. 2005) pp 49–50.

External links

  
 
 
 
 Carrie'' at the TCM Movie Database

Carrie (franchise)
1976 films
1976 horror films
1970s English-language films
1970s high school films
1970s horror thriller films
1970s supernatural horror films
1970s teen horror films
American coming-of-age films
American films about revenge
American high school films
American horror thriller films
American supernatural horror films
American supernatural thriller films
American teen horror films
Films about bullying
Films about child abuse
Films about mass murder
Films about pranks
Films about proms
Films about school violence
Films about sexual repression
Films about telekinesis
Films based on American horror novels
Films based on works by Stephen King
Films directed by Brian De Palma
Films scored by Pino Donaggio
Films set in 1976
Films set in Maine
Films shot in Los Angeles
Matricide in fiction
Films about mother–daughter relationships
Religious horror films
Films about self-harm
United Artists films
1970s American films
United States National Film Registry films